Rudolf Willem de Korte (8 July 1936 – 9 January 2020) was a Dutch politician of the People's Party for Freedom and Democracy (VVD) and businessman.

Life and career
De Korte was born in The Hague, Netherlands. He attended the Maerlant Gymnasium from May 1948 until June 1954, and studied at the Leiden University in September 1954 majoring in Chemistry and obtaining a Bachelor of Science degree in July 1957, before graduating with a Master of Science degree with honors on 18 October 1961, and worked as a researcher before he got a doctorate as a Doctor of Science in Chemistry on 21 May 1964. De Korte studied at the Harvard Business School of the Harvard University in Cambridge, Massachusetts in January 1962 for a postgraduate education in Business administration obtaining a Master of Business Administration degree in November 1964. De Korte subsequently studied at the Cranfield University in Cranfield, England in May 1962 for another postgraduate education in Business administration graduating with a Master of Business and Management degree in December 1964. De Korte worked as a salesman for Unilever from December 1964 until December 1977 in Hong Kong from December 1964 until March 1966 and in Addis Ababa, Ethiopia from March 1966 until October 1968 and as a corporate director from October 1968 until December 1977.

De Korte served as the People's Party for Freedom and Democracy campaign manager for the elections of 1972 and 1977. De Korte became a Member of the House of Representatives after Hans Wiegel was appointed as Deputy Prime Minister and Minister of the Interior in the Cabinet Van Agt–Wiegel following the cabinet formation of 1977, taking office on 22 December 1977 serving as a frontbencher and spokesperson for Economic Affairs and Social Affairs. De Korte was appointed as Minister of the Interior in the Cabinet Lubbers I following the death of Koos Rietkerk, taking office on 12 March 1986. After the election of 1986 De Korte returned as a Member of the House of Representatives, taking office on 3 June 1986. After the Leader of the People's Party for Freedom and Democracy and Parliamentary leader of the People's Party for Freedom and Democracy in the House of Representatives Ed Nijpels announced he was stepping down as Leader and Parliamentary leader in the House of Representatives following the defeat in the election, the People's Party for Freedom and Democracy leadership approached De Korte as his successor, De Korte accepted and became the Leader of the People's Party for Freedom and Democracy, taking office on 9 July 1986. Following the cabinet formation of 1986 De Korte was appointed as Deputy Prime Minister and Minister of Economic Affairs in the Cabinet Lubbers II, taking office on 14 July 1986. On 15 December 1986 De Korte announced that he was stepping down as Leader in favor of Parliamentary leader in the House of Representatives Joris Voorhoeve. The Cabinet Lubbers II fell on 3 May 1989 following a disagreement in the coalition about the increase of tariffs and excises and continued to serve in a demissionary capacity. After the election of 1989 De Korte again returned as a Member of the House of Representatives, taking office on 14 September 1989. The Cabinet Lubbers II was replaced by the Cabinet Lubbers III following the cabinet formation of 1989 on 7 November 1989 and he continued to serve in the House of Representatives as a frontbencher and spokesperson for Economic Affairs and deputy spokesperson for Finances.

In August 1995 De Korte was nominated as a vice president of the European Investment Bank (EIB), and he resigned as Member of the House of Representatives the same day he was installed as vice president, serving from 1 September 1995 until 30 June 2000. De Korte served as Vice Chairman of the Supervisory board of the European Investment Bank from 1 September 2001 until 16 January 2012.

Decorations

References

External links

Official
  Dr. R.W. (Rudolf) de Korte Parlement & Politiek

 

 

1936 births
2020 deaths
Alumni of Cranfield University
Commanders of the Order of Orange-Nassau
Commanders of the Order of the Netherlands Lion
Deputy Prime Ministers of the Netherlands
Dutch bankers
Dutch campaign managers
20th-century Dutch chemists
Dutch corporate directors
Dutch expatriates in England
Dutch expatriates in Ethiopia
Dutch expatriates in Hong Kong
Dutch expatriates in Luxembourg
Dutch expatriates in the United States
Dutch officials of the European Union
Dutch nonprofit directors
Dutch people of German descent
Grand Crosses of the Order of Merit (Portugal)
Grand Officiers of the Légion d'honneur
Harvard Business School alumni
Knights Commander of the Order of Merit of the Federal Republic of Germany
Leaders of the People's Party for Freedom and Democracy
Leiden University alumni
Academic staff of Leiden University
Ministers of Economic Affairs of the Netherlands
Ministers of the Interior of the Netherlands
Members of the House of Representatives (Netherlands)
Municipal councillors of Wassenaar
People's Party for Freedom and Democracy politicians
Politicians from The Hague
Unilever people
20th-century Dutch businesspeople
20th-century Dutch politicians
21st-century Dutch businesspeople